Penrod may refer to:
Penrod, a collection of comic sketches by Booth Tarkington published in 1914
Penrod (film), a 1922 film directed by Marshall Neilan
Penrod, Kentucky

People with the name Penrod
Guy Penrod
Jerry Penrod
Steve Penrod